Wreckless is a 1935 American short film directed by William A. Shilling and starring Patricia Morison. It was Morrison's screen debut.

Premise 
Mary Jane is a young woman who falls for an automobile salesman whose 75-miles-per-hour speeding gets him in trouble with the law. Under arrest, he persuades Mary Jane to ask her father's attorney to represent him.

Cast 
Martin Griffith as Jack Wade
Patricia Morison as Mary Jane
Robert T. Haines as Attorney Knowlton
John T. Dwyer as C. Vincent Clark
Thomas W. Ross as The Judge

Soundtrack

External links 

1935 films
American drama short films
1930s English-language films
1935 drama films
American black-and-white films
1930s American films